Lycophotia molothina is a moth of the family Noctuidae. It is distributed throughout southwest- and central Europe. It is found wherever its food plants grow. It is traditionally thought of as a species of heathland.

This species shows a wingspan of 38–40 mm. The forewings are brown or grey, often tinged with red or blue and marked with a whitish streak at the front part. Orbicular and reniform stigma are grey and well defined. The hindwings are light grey. Lycophotia molothina flies from May to the end of July and is attracted to light and sugar.

The young larva is light green with five pale lines. Adult larvae change their colour into dark green, reddish or brown. They feed on Calluna vulgaris. The species overwinters as a larva.

Subspecies 
Lycophotia molothina molothina
Lycophotia molothina occidentalis (Bellier, 1860)

Reading
Michael Fibiger: Noctuidae Europaeae. Vol. 2, Entomological Press, Sorø 1993, .

External links 

Fauna Europaea
Lepiforum.de

Lycophotia
Moths described in 1789
Moths of Europe
Taxa named by Eugenius Johann Christoph Esper